|}

The Swinton Handicap Hurdle is a Grade 3 National Hunt hurdle race in Great Britain which is open to horses aged four years or older. It is run at Haydock Park over a distance of about 1 mile 7½ furlongs (1 miles, 7 furlongs and 144 yards or ), and during its running there are nine hurdles to be jumped. It is a handicap race, and it is scheduled to take place each year in May.

The event was established in 1978, and it was initially sponsored by Royal Doulton.  The winner of the inaugural race collected just over £20,000, making it the fourth most lucrative prize behind the Grand National, Cheltenham Gold Cup and Champion Hurdle. Subsequent sponsors have included Swinton Insurance (1985–93), Crowther and Merewood Homes (1994–2003), Betfred (2006–07) and Totesport (2008–11). The present sponsors, Pertemps, began supporting the race in 2012. The Swinton Handicap Hurdle takes place at a meeting which features both jump and flat racing, and outside of the main National Hunt season (October-April), is the highest graded race in the calendar.

Records

Most successful horses (2 wins):
 Dreams End – 1994, 1997
 Eradicate – 2010, 2011

Leading jockeys (2 wins):
 Andy Turnell – Beacon Light (1979), Secret Ballot (1982)
 David Bridgwater – Winnie the Witch (1991), Tragic Hero (1996)
 Graham Lee – Coat of Honour (2005), Blue Bajan (2008)
 Paul Moloney – Barizan (2013), Ballyglasheen (2014)

Leading trainers (4 wins):
 Martin Pipe – Corporal Clinger (1985), Tragic Hero (1996), Rainbow Frontier (1998), Acambo (2006)
 Evan Williams - Barizan (2013), Ballyglasheen (2014), John Constable (2017), Silver Streak (2018)

Winners
 Weights given in stones and pounds.

See also
 Horse racing in Great Britain
 List of British National Hunt races

References

 Racing Post:

 pedigreequery.com – Swinton Handicap Hurdle – Haydock.
 racenewsonline.co.uk – Swinton Handicap Hurdle (2007).

External links
 Race Recordings 

National Hunt races in Great Britain
Haydock Park Racecourse
National Hunt hurdle races
Recurring sporting events established in 1978
1978 establishments in England